Vytautas Girnius (born 4 February 1959) is a retired Lithuanian Paralympic athlete who competed at international track and field competitions. He is a double Paralympic champion for the Soviet Union in 1988 Summer Paralympics, he is also a two-time Paralympic silver medalist and a World bronze medalist for Lithuania.

Disability
In 1972, thirteen year old Girnius and a few of his friends played games in his hometown. One of his friends found a WW2 bomb grenade, his friend detonated the bomb by puncturing it with a nail. The force of the blast killed two of his friends, one aged fifteen and the other thirteen, Girnius lost his eyesight permenantly from the explosion.

Sporting achievements
Once Girnius left hospital, he was interested in competing in athletics. In 1980, he joined the Kaunas Academy for the Blind and Visually Impaired coached by Jonas Burakov. He took part in the 1988 Summer Paralympics and won two gold medals where he became the first Paralympic champion for Lithuania. In 1992, he competed once more at the 1992 Summer Paralympics where he competed for his home country after Lithuania became independent in the year before, he won a silver medal in the pentathlon and was one of the first six independent Lithuanian medalists. Girnius was awarded the Order of the Grand Duke Gediminas III in 1996 and the Fair Play Laureate Prize a year later.

References

1959 births
Living people
People from Virbalis
Paralympic athletes of Lithuania
Paralympic athletes of the Soviet Union
Lithuanian male javelin throwers
Soviet male javelin throwers
Athletes (track and field) at the 1988 Summer Paralympics
Athletes (track and field) at the 1992 Summer Paralympics
Athletes (track and field) at the 1996 Summer Paralympics
Athletes (track and field) at the 2000 Summer Paralympics
Athletes (track and field) at the 2004 Summer Paralympics
Medalists at the 1988 Summer Paralympics
Medalists at the 1992 Summer Paralympics
Medalists at the 1996 Summer Paralympics
Paralympic silver medalists for Lithuania
Medalists at the World Para Athletics Championships